3epkano are a post-rock band from Dublin, Ireland, formed in 2004. The band have released three albums.

The band have composed and performed original live scores for numerous classics of silent cinema, including The Cabinet of Dr. Caligari, Metropolis, Faust, Diary of a Lost Girl, Nosferatu and Der Golem.

Discography
Albums
3epkano (Smiling Politely, 2006)
At Land (Smiling Politely, 2007)
Hans the Reluctant Wolf Juggler (Smiling Politely, 2011)

References

External links
Official website
3epkano on Facebook

Irish post-rock groups